Jacob Ulfeldt (1535 – 8 October 1593) was a Danish diplomat and member of the Privy Council from 1565. He is mostly known for his very troubled diplomatic journey into Russia in 1578 during which he  concluded an unfavourable treaty with Tsar Ivan IV (1530–1584) that brought him to disgrace at home. His bitter attempts of getting satisfaction only damaged his case. However his account of his Russian travels (published by Melchior Goldast in Latin during 1608) is still considered a main source of Danish-Russian relations as well as of 16th Century Russia. He was the father of Jacob Ulfeldt (born 1567).

Early life and education
Ulfeldt was the son of Knud Ebbesen Ulfeldt and  Anne Eriksdatter Hardenberg. He studied  at Louvain in 1551  and Wittenberg in 1554.

Diplomatic career

Ylfeldt entered the state service in 1562. In 1566, he became a member of the Rigsrådet. He is mostly known for his very troubled diplomatic journey into Russia in 1578 during which he  concluded an unfavourable treaty with Tsar Ivan IV (1530–1584) that brought him to disgrace at home. His bitter attempts of getting satisfaction only damaged his case.

Property
 
Ylfeldt's wife brought the estate Bavelse into the marriage. In 1566, Ulfeldt inherited [[Holckenhavn Castle|Kogsbølle] on Funen and Selsø in Hornsherred. He constructed new main buildings on all three estates. He purchased  Dronninglund Castle in Jutland in 1563 but sold it again in 1568.

Personal life

Ulfeldt was married to Anne Jakobsdatter Flemming  (1544-1570) and had three sons; Mogens Ulfeldt (1569–1616), Jacob Ulfeldt (1567–1630) and Corfitz Ulfeldt (1559–1614). Mogens Ulfeldt reached the rank of Admiral of the Realm. Jacob Ulfeldt was a diplomat and chancellor of King Christian IV of Denmark.

Legacy
Ylfeldt's account of his Russian travels (published by Melchior Goldast in Latin during 1608) is still considered a main source of Danish-Russian relations as well as of 16th Century Russia.

See also
Livonian War

References

Other sources
Dansk Biografisk Leksikon, vol. 15, Copenh. 1984.

External links 
Hodoeporicon Ruthenicum  (The Voyage to Russia), by Dr Rima Greenhill, Stanford University. ucd.ie
 Nobiliss. Et Strenvissimi Eqvitis Dani, Iacobi Vlfeldii, Domini in Vlsfeldtzholm Et Selsovia &c. Regii Danorum Consiliarij, Legatio Moscovitica Siue Hodoeporicon Rvthenicvm : In Qvo De Rvssorvm, Moschorvm Et Tatarorvm, Regionibus, Moribus, Religione, Gubernatione, & Aula Imperatoria quo potuit compendio & eleganter exsequitur. Francofvrti, Apud Matthævm Merianvm. M. DC. XXVII. (Book title of second edition in Latin from 1627), worldcat.org
Ruslandsrejsen (Ulfeldt's journey into Russia.) This page includes Ulfeldt's account in Latin along with a translation into Danish. - crassus.dk (in Danish)
Danish Impressions of Russia in 1578. A Comparative Analysis of Three Travel Descriptions (Jacob Ulfeldt, his Priest and NN), by John H. Lind (U. of Copenhagen)

1535 births
1593 deaths
16th-century Danish diplomats
16th-century Danish politicians
16th-century Danish memoirists
16th-century Danish nobility
Jacob, 1535